Villanova del Battista is a town and comune in the province of Avellino, Campania, southern Italy.

Located in Irpinia historical district between the Ufita Valley and Daunian Mountains, the town is part of the Roman Catholic Diocese of Ariano Irpino-Lacedonia. Its territory borders the municipalities of Ariano Irpino, Flumeri, and Zungoli.

References

Cities and towns in Campania